Juhani Juice Leskinen (officially Pauli Matti Juhani "Juice" Leskinen; 19 February 1950 – 24 November 2006), better known as Juice Leskinen ( as if the word juice were Finnish) was one of the most important and successful Finnish singer-songwriters of the late 20th century. From the early 1970s onward he released nearly 30 full-length albums and wrote song lyrics for dozens of other Finnish artists. Several of Leskinen's songs have reached classic status in Finnish popular music, e.g., "Viidestoista yö", "Kaksoiselämää" and "Syksyn sävel". His early records are considered staples of the so-called Manserock movement of the mid-'70s. He also wrote poetry and plays and published nine collections of verse and seven plays.

After moving to Tampere to study English translation in 1970, Leskinen began his recording career in 1973 with the eponymous debut album of Juice Leskinen & Coitus Int. One more record, Per Vers, runoilija, was made under the same band name, but from then on he released records with several line-ups, most notably Juice Leskinen Slam and Juice Leskinen Grand Slam from the late 1970s until the mid 1980s. Although concentrating more on poetry from the early 1990s, Leskinen still released new music every few years despite his failing health, which was caused by the unhealthy lifestyle he had led for years. After the longest hiatus of his recording career, L marked Leskinen's 50th birthday in 2000. His last record, Senaattori ja boheemi (released in 2004), is a collaboration with Mikko Alatalo, a return to their partnership of the early 1970s. He wrote "Nuku pommiin" in 1982 for the Eurovision Song Contest.

Juice Leskinen's most famous songs include "Viidestoista yö" ("Fifteenth Night"), "Musta aurinko nousee" ("A Sun Rises out of Me", often misunderstood as "The Black Sun Rises" despite a clear pause between "musta" and "aurinko"), "Marilyn", "Rakkauden ammattilainen" ("Love Pro"), "Norjalainen villapaita" ("Norwegian Sweater") and "Kaksoiselämää" (Double Life).

Leskinen was diagnosed with Asperger syndrome in the early 2000s.

He qualified 38th in the poll of the 100 greatest Finns held during the summer of 2004.

Leskinen died in 2006 after suffering from chronic kidney disease, cirrhosis and diabetes. He is buried in Kalevankangas cemetery, Tampere, near the main gate.

Leskinen has gained a considerable amount of posthumous recognition. A musical about Leskinen, titled Juice – taiteilijaelämää (an artist's life) premiered in Tampere on 30 August 2011.
In 2015, two film companies announced plans for biography films. One of them was cancelled.
In 2014 a biography of Leskinen was published, written by Antti Heikkinen, and named Risainen elämä. Juice Leskinen 1950–2006.

Discography
 1973 Juice Leskinen & Coitus Int.: Juice Leskinen & Coitus Int
 1974 Juice Leskinen & Coitus Int.: Per Vers, runoilija
 1975 Juice Leskinen & Mikko Alatalo: Juice ja Mikko
 1976 Juice: Keskitysleirin ruokavalio
 1977 Juice: Lahtikaupungin rullaluistelijat
 1978 Juice Leskinen Slam: Tauko I
 1978 Välikausitakki: Välikausitakki
 1979 Juice Leskinen Slam: Tauko II
 1980 Juice Leskinen Slam: XV yö (Tauko III)
 1980 Juice Leskinen Slam: Kuusessa ollaan
 1981 Juice Leskinen Slam: Ajan Henki
 1981 Juice Leskinen: Dokumentti
 1982 Juice Leskinen Grand Slam: Sivilisaatio
 1983 Juice Leskinen Grand Slam: Deep Sea Diver
 1983 Juice Leskinen Grand Slam: Boogieteorian alkeet peruskoulun ala-astetta varten – lyhyt oppimäärä
 1984 Juice Leskinen Grand Slam: Kuopio-Iisalmi-Nivala (Live)
 1985 Juice Leskinen Grand Slam: Pyromaani palaa rikospaikalle
 1986 Juice Leskinen Grand Slam: Yölento
 1987 Juice Leskinen: Minä
 1990 Juice Leskinen: Sinä 
 1991 Juice Leskinen Grand Slam: Taivaan kappaleita
 1992 Juice Leskinen Etc.: Simsalabim Jim
 1993 Juice Leskinen: Haitaribussi
 1996 Juice Leskinen: Kiveä ja sämpylää
 2000 Juice Leskinen: L
 2002 Juice Leskinen: Vaiti, aivan hiljaa
 2004 Juice Leskinen & Mikko Alatalo: Senaattori ja boheemi
 2005 (live) Juice Leskinen & Mikko Alatalo: Klassikoiden ilta
 2008 (live) JuiceRemuDave – Live!
 2015 (live) Juice Leskinen & Ari Kankaanpää

Official collection albums 
 1976 Singlet 1974–76
 1977 Tähän saakka
 1992 Sietämätön mies
 1997 Kautta aikain
 2000 Maamme (Vårt land)
 2003 Tuomaksen Evankeliumi
 2006 Kautta aikain 2
 2007 Syksyn sävel – Kaikki singlet 1974–2004

Other collection albums 
 1981 Oikea valinta: Juice – 14 parasta puolta
 1982 Parhaat
 1982 Kokoelma
 1983 Tupla: Ajan henki / Dokumentti
 1984 Matka Suomeen
 1986 Masters
 1986 Parhaat
 1987 Parhaat
 1987 Juice Leskinen Slam
 1988 Lauluja rakastamisen vaikeudesta
 1989 Extra
 1991 2 alkuperäistä (Tauko II / Tauko III)
 1991 Juicinfonia, esitt. The New Generation Orchestra, joht. Tuomas Lampela
 1992 12 alkuperäistä
 1993 12 alkuperäistä
 1993 Valitut teokset
 1994 Suomen parhaat
 1994 Lauluja rakastamisen vaikeudesta
 1995 20 suosikkia – Ei elämästä selviä hengissä
 1997 20 suosikkia – Onnellinen mies
 2008 Juice Leskinen – Parhaat
 2012 20 × Juice Leskinen
 2012 20 × Juice Leskinen & Grand Slam
 2013 Sävel ja sanat
 2014 37 laulua Suomesta
 2014 Johanna-vuodet, osa 1
 2014 Johanna-vuodet 1982–1983
 2015 Kaikkien aikojen Juice (2015)
 2016 Love-vuodet 1973–1978

Filmography 
 The Saimaa Gesture (1981)
 The Last Border (1993)

Literary works

Collections of poetry
 1975 Sonetteja laumalle
 1981 Sanoja
 1989 Iltaisin, kun veneet tulevat kotiin
 1990 Pieniä sanoja sinulle, jota rakastan
 1994 Äeti (luonnos muistelmiksi, runoja)
 1996 Jumala on
 1998 Maanosamme, maailmamme
 1999 Aika jätti (Runoja)
 2002 Ilonkorjuun aika 2002

Children's books
 1987 Satuinen musiikkituokio (with Matti Pellonpää, book and cassette)
 1992 Räkä ja Roiskis
 1995 Räkä ja Roiskis Suuvedellä
 1997 Räkä ja Roiskis naisissa

Other works
 1978 Kuka murhasi rock'n' roll tähden (diary)
 1984 Päivää (short stories)
 1993 Vaikuttajat korvissamme (essays)
 2003 Siinäpä tärkeimmät: edellinen osa E. Ch. (memoirs)

Plays
 1980 Valto
 1983 Isänmaan toivo
 1984 Ravintola Wunderbar
 1985 Kolme hanhea matkalla pohjoiseen (with Liisa Laukkarinen)
 1988 Harald Hirmuinen
 1990 Mikä ny
 1996 Soma rillumarei

See also
List of best-selling music artists in Finland

References

External links
 Obituary in English @ Helsingin Sanomat
 A list of books in his library on LibraryThing

1950 births
2006 deaths
Artists with autism
People from Juankoski
Deaths from diabetes
Deaths from cirrhosis
Deaths from kidney failure
20th-century Finnish male singers
Finnish songwriters
20th-century Finnish poets
Finnish lyricists
Finnish columnists
21st-century Finnish poets
Finnish male poets
20th-century male writers
21st-century male writers
People with Asperger syndrome